Mohammad-Sadegh Khayatian (born 1980) is an Iranian policy analyst and assistant professor of science and technology at Shahid Beheshti University. Ebrahim Raisi, Iranian president, appointed Mohammad Sadegh Khayatian as head of the Center for Strategic Studies in November 2021.

Life
Khayatian was the Director of the Center for Knowledge-Based Companies and Institutions of the Vice President for Science and Technology and a member of the Board of Directors of the Innovation and Prosperity Fund. Just recently, he was appointed a full member of the Board of Trustees of Iran National Innovation Fund by President Raisi. Khayatian holds a PhD in Technology Management from Allameh Tabatabai University and is assistant professor of science and technology at Shahid Beheshti University.

Books
 A Summary of Research and Technology Functions, Iran University Press 2010
 Introduction to Technology Intelligence, Rasa 2017
 Open Innovation Research, Management, and Practice, Joseph Tidd, Khayatian et al. (tr.), SBU Press 2018
 Technology Readiness Level: an Introduction, ACECR 2020
 Technology and Innovation in Large Enterprises, Chapar 2020

References

External links
Khayatian at SBU

Iranian political scientists
1980 births
Academic staff of Shahid Beheshti University
Allameh Tabataba'i University alumni
Living people
Management scientists